The First Secretary of the Yakut regional branch of the Communist Party of the Soviet Union was the position of highest authority in the Yakut ASSR in the Russian SFSR of the Soviet Union. The position was created on June 6, 1920, and abolished in August 1991. The First Secretary was a de facto appointed position usually by the Politburo or the General Secretary himself.

List of First Secretaries of the Yakut Communist Party

See also
Yakut Autonomous Soviet Socialist Republic

Notes

Sources
 World Statesmen.org

Regional Committees of the Communist Party of the Soviet Union
Politics of the Sakha Republic
1920 establishments in Russia
1991 disestablishments in the Soviet Union